The 2019–20 VTB United League was the 11th season of the VTB United League. It was the seventh season that the league functions as the Russian domestic first tier level.

CSKA Moscow was the defending champion.

On 13 March, the season was suspended due to the COVID-19 pandemic. On 27 March, the season was cancelled, with no champion declared for that season.

Format changes
From this season, playoff games will be played in a best-of-three format with a 1–1–1 structure.

Teams
A total of 13 teams from five countries contest the league, including nine sides from Russia, one from Belarus, one from Estonia, one from Kazakhstan, and one from Poland.

This season VEF Riga from Latvia cancelled the participation.

Venues and locations

Regular season
In the regular season, teams play against each other twice (home-and-away) in a round-robin format.

Standings

Results

Awards

MVP of the Month

VTB League teams in European competitions

References

External links 

 Official website

 
2019-20
2019–20 in European basketball leagues
2019–20 in Russian basketball
2019–20 in Estonian basketball
2019–20 in Belarusian basketball
2019–20 in Kazakhstani basketball
2019–20 in Polish basketball
Basketball events curtailed and voided due to the COVID-19 pandemic